The Hollywood Christmas Parade (formerly the Hollywood Santa Parade and Santa Claus Lane Parade) is an annual American parade held on the Sunday after Thanksgiving in Hollywood, Los Angeles, California. It follows a 3.5-mile (5.6 km) route along Hollywood Boulevard, then back along Sunset Boulevard, featuring various celebrities.

Traditionally, Santa Claus appears at the end.

History

1900s
Beginning in 1928, Hollywood merchants transformed a one-mile stretch of Hollywood Boulevard into "Santa Claus Lane" to boost shopping. Part of the promotion was a daily parade featuring Santa Claus and a film star. Originally called the Santa Claus Lane Parade, the inaugural event featured only Santa Claus and the actress Jeanette Loff.

The parade continued to grow in scale with the help of local businesses and the community. In 1931, Santa Claus rode a truck-pulled float instead of the reindeer-pulled carriage of previous years. American Legion Post 43 marched with a color guard, drum line, and bugle corps.

The parade was suspended from 1942 to 1944 due to World War II and reopened in 1945 with record attendance.

In 1946, Gene Autry rode his horse in the parade and was inspired by the children yelling "Here comes Santa Claus, Here comes Santa Claus," to write the song "Here Comes Santa Claus" along with Oakley Haldeman. Autry would become a perennial Grand Marshal of the parade.

The parade continued to grow throughout the 1950s, '60s, and '70s, adding floats, animals, bands and celebrities. By 1978, the parade had been renamed the Hollywood Christmas Parade in order to attract more celebrities, and was broadcast locally on KTLA (which was purchased by Autry's Golden West Broadcasters in 1964) with the help of Autry and Johnny Grant. This change coincided with a shift in the parade's scheduling from Thanksgiving Eve to the Sunday after Thanksgiving, and continued to be a decades-long tradition on Los Angeles's channel 5, even after Autry's sale of KTLA to KKR in 1982, then Tribune Broadcasting in 1985.

2000s
In 2002, an attempt to present the parade as a primetime special on NBC sponsored by Blockbuster imperiled the future of the parade, as the presentation was lowly-rated. Renamed the Blockbuster Hollywood Christmas Spectacular and produced by Bob Bain, the parade was nearly completely dispensed with for pre-recorded and rehearsed spotlights in the vein of NBC's popular Macy's Thanksgiving Day Parade, pre-recorded musical performances from LeAnn Rimes and Destiny's Child to promote their new holiday albums, along with much lower wattage star power, as most of the celebrities highlighted were either older or lower-tier actors exclusively starring on NBC series. Inexplicably, the special ended with a completely unrelated stunt involving a  fall by stuntperson Mikal Kartvedt off a 12-story building to promote the Blockbuster-exclusive home video rental release of the film XXX (the actual parade would air without any of the Bain-produced elements on Christmas morning on KCOP-TV). The following year, the Hollywood Chamber of Commerce announced it would discontinue airing the parade on KTLA and other Tribune Broadcasting stations due to rising production costs.

In March 2007, the Hollywood Chamber of Commerce decided to end the parade's run due to lack of celebrities and a loss of $100,000 for the 2006 production, which The Associated Press said cost about $1 million to mount.

However, later in 2007, the City of Los Angeles created a new parade to replace the Hollywood Christmas Parade, entitled the Hollywood Santa Parade and produced on the weekend after Thanksgiving (the original parade had traditionally been held on the Wednesday evening before the holiday). Participation in the new parade became by invitation only, and Bob Barker, fresh from his farewell tapings as host of The Price Is Right, was that year's Parade Grand Marshal. 2007 and 2008, KTLA aired the new parade on a tape-delayed basis.

It was later announced that MyNetworkTV would telecast the 2009 parade (with the Hollywood Christmas Parade name restored) in two consecutive prime-time showings: the first scheduled for December 10, the second for Christmas Eve night. The parade has since been produced annually by Associated Television International, which then coordinated airings on the Hallmark Channel, and in traditional syndication in later years.

Since 2015, the parade has been recorded and edited, then aired as a part of The CW's annual holiday programming, still being produced by ATI (thus airing on KTLA locally as a part of the CW lineup). Lifestyle also carries the parade internationally.

The parade was not held in 2020 because of the COVID-19 pandemic. Instead, a TV special titled The Hollywood Christmas Parade Greatest Moments premiered on December 4, 2020 on The CW.

Grand Marshals
 1928 - Jeanette Loff
 1932 - Joe E. Brown
 1939 - Gene Autry
 1940 
 Sheriff Eugene Biscailuz
 Joan Leslie
Roy Rogers
 Harry Sherman
 1941 - Irene Rich
 1948 - Bob Hope
 1949–1951 Sheriff Eugene Biscailuz
 1957 - Art Linkletter
 1958 - Lawrence Welk
 1959 - Charlton Heston
 1960, 1981 - Dale Evans and Roy Rogers
 1961 - Gene Autry
 1962 - Danny Thomas
 1963 - Mary Pickford
 1964 - Dick Van Dyke
 1965 - Robert Vaughn
 1966 - Pat Boone
 1967 - Fred MacMurray
 1968 - Buddy Ebsen
 1969 - Walter Matthau
 1970 - Ernest Borgnine
 1971 - Johnny Mathis
 1972 - General Robert E. Cushman Jr.
 1973 - Danny Thomas
 1974 - John Wayne
 1975 - Lawrence Welk
 1976 - General Omar Bradley
 1977 - Jimmy Stewart
 1978 - Bob Hope
 1979 - Robert Wagner and Natalie Wood 
 1980 - Gene Autry
 1982 - Ron Howard
 1983 - George Peppard
 1984 - Michael Landon
 1985 - William Shatner
 1986 - Mickey and Minnie Mouse
 1987 - James Stewart
 1988 - Tony Danza
 1989 - Sammy Davis Jr.
 1990 - Arnold Schwarzenegger
 1991 - Charlton Heston
 1992 - Tom Arnold and Roseanne Barr
 1993 - Bob and Dolores Hope
 1994 - Louis Gossett Jr.
 1995 - Tony Danza
 1996 - David Hasselhoff
 1997 - Tom Arnold
 1998 - Robert Urich
 1999 - Beau Bridges
 2000 - Dennis Hopper and Frankie Muñiz
 2001 - Peter Fonda
 2002 - Mickey Rooney
 2003 - Johnny Grant
 2004 - Magic Johnson 
 2005 - Antonio Villaraigosa
 2006 - George López
 2007 - Bob Barker
 2008 - Joy and Regis Philbin 
 2009 - Susan Lucci
 2010 - Larry King
 2011 - Marie Osmond
 2012 - Joe Mantegna
 2013 - Buzz Aldrin
 2014 - Stevie Wonder
 2015 - Penn & Teller
 2016 - Olivia Newton-John
 2017 - Mehmet C. Oz
 2018 - Nancy O'Dell
 2019 - Mario López
 2021 - Sheryl Underwood
 2022 - Danny Trejo

See also
List of Christmas and holiday season parades

References

Resources
Official website
Hollywood Christmas Parade (seeing-stars)
Hollywood Christmas Parade (Chamber of Commerce)

Culture of Hollywood, Los Angeles
Christmas television specials
Christmas and holiday season parades
Parades in the United States
Television series by Associated Television International
Hollywood Boulevard